Cesael "Shaq" Delos Santos is a Filipino volleyball coach who was head coach of the Cignal HD Spikers of the Premier Volleyball League.

Education
Delos Santos attended the Far Eastern University (FEU).

Career

College
Delos Santos worked as an assistant coach for the University of Santo Tomas (UST) Golden Tigresses. He became head coach in 2008, after coach August Santamaria suffered from a mild stroke. He resigned from UST in April 2011. He left to coach for his alma mater.

Delos Santos coached the FEU women's team to three Final Four appearances from Season 77 to 80 (2014–2017).

In August 2022, Delos Santos was appointed as head coach of the University of the Philippines Fighting Maroons women's team.

Club
Delos Santos has coached in the Philippine Super Liga (PSL). He was head coach of the Petron Blaze Spikers from 2016 to 2019, helping the team clinch four titles in four competitions namely the 2017 All-Filipino, 2018 Grand Prix and All-Filipino, and the 2019 Grand Prix Conferences.

In 2017, he led a PSL selection team in the 2017 Annual Princess Maha Chakri Sirindhorn's Cup Volleyball Tournament in Sisaket, Thailand.

PSL side Cignal HD Spikers tapped Delos Santos as an assistant coach to Edgar Barroga in January 2020. In March 2021, he was elevated as head coach of the Cignal HD Spikers after Barroga's departure. He became the team's first coach in the Premier Volleyball League (PVL) after Cignal left the PSL.

National team
In 2018, Delos Santos was appointed as head coach of the Philippines women's national team replacing Ramil de Jesus.

References

Filipino volleyball coaches
Far Eastern University alumni
Volleyball coaches of international teams
Living people
Year of birth missing (living people)